The Budapest–Murakeresztúr railway is a cca.  long railway line in Hungary that connects the Hungarian capital city Budapest with Nagykanizsa and Murakeresztúr. South of Murakeresztúr, the railway connects to the Croatian railway system, specifically the M501 railway serving Čakovec. The M501 connects to the Slovene railways at Središče ob Dravi, extending to Pragersko, while the R201 line branching off in Čakovec serves Varaždin.

The line is mostly single-tracked and electrified.

History 
In 1856, Concessions for the railways were granted to the private company, the Emperor Franz-Joseph Orient-Railway: from Ofen via Nagykanizsa to Pöltschach (Poljčane) on the mainline of the Austrian Southern Railway Company. The construction began in 1857, and the firm was merged with the Southern Railway Company in the following year. The building progressed, and trains could run as of 24 April 1860 on the section Pragerhof–Nagykanisza. On 1 April 1861, the section Ofen–Nagykanisza was opened for traffic. The principal artificial structures were the Gellért Hill tunnel in Budapest, railway bridges on the Mur and on the Sárviz waterway. The corporation collaborated with the Lake Balaton Company to lower the level of Lake Balaton in order to protect the railway track and its foundation.

Gallery

References

External links

Railway line constructed in 1861

Railway lines in Hungary
1861 establishments in Hungary